is a Japanese manga series written and illustrated Hinako Takanaga. It was serialized in the monthly  manga magazine Magazine Be × Boy from September 2004 to September 2016.

Plot

Satoru Tono is an introverted, expressionless high school student in love with Keigo Tamiya, a popular boy from the baseball club. One day, Keigo confesses to Satoru that he is in love with him, and while Satoru is overjoyed, his lack of facial expression and shyness makes it difficult for him to communicate his feelings. Over time, Keigo comes to understand Satoru more, and the two explore challenges in their relationship.

Characters

Satoru is a second-year high school student and a member of the art club. He does not easily show emotion on his face, causing many people to misunderstand him.

Keigo is a second-year high school student and a member of the baseball club.

Yuji is a third-year high school student and a member of the student council. He is Satoru's childhood friend.

Takahito is a third-year high school student and a member of the student council who falls in love with Yuji.

Media

Manga

Awkward Silence is written and illustrated by Hinako Takanaga. It was serialized in monthly manga magazine Magazine Be × Boy beginning in the October 2004 issue released in September 2004. The series briefly went on hiatus, but resumed in the January 2011 issue of Magazine Be × Boy released on December 11, 2011, until its end in the October 2016 issue released on September 7, 2016. The chapters were later released in 6 bound volumes by Libre under the Be × Boy Comics imprint. Volumes 4 and 6 were distributed with comic booklets as a limited edition first press bonus.

Animate USA initially distributed the first volume of Awkward Silence overseas through the Kindle Store in 2010. In 2011, JManga listed the series as one of the titles they had planned on distributing in English. In February 2012, Viz Media licensed the series for North American distribution in English under their SuBLime imprint.

Drama CDs

Two drama CDs were produced by Libre under their  CD label, Cue Egg Label, during the series' run, starring Kōki Miyata as Satoru Tono, Hiroki Takahashi as Keigo Tamiya, and Kōji Yusa as Yuji Sagara. The first drama CD was released on March 28, 2008 and peaked at #270 on the Oricon Weekly Albums Chart. The second drama CD was released on February 25, 2009, adding Tomokazu Sugita as a cast member, who voices Takahito Kagami.

Reception

Volume 5 peaked at #45 on Oricon and sold 17,466 physical copies on its first week of sales.

References

External links
 
 

Japanese radio dramas
LGBT in anime and manga
SuBLime manga
Yaoi anime and manga
2000s LGBT literature